A cofferdam is an enclosure built within a body of water to allow the enclosed area to be pumped out. This pumping creates a dry working environment so that the work can be carried out safely. Cofferdams are commonly used for construction or repair of permanent dams, oil platforms, bridge piers, etc., built within water. 

These cofferdams are usually welded steel structures, with components consisting of sheet piles, wales, and cross braces. Such structures are usually dismantled after the construction work is completed.

The origin of the word comes from coffer (originally from Latin cophinus meaning "basket") and dam from Proto-Germanic *dammaz meaning "barrier across a stream of water to obstruct its flow and raise its level").

Uses 
For dam construction, two cofferdams are usually built, one upstream and one downstream of the proposed dam, after an alternative diversion tunnel or channel has been provided for the river flow to bypass the foundation area of the dam. These cofferdams are typically a conventional embankment dam of both earth- and rock-fill, but concrete or some sheet piling also may be used. Usually, upon completion of the dam and associated structures, the downstream coffer is removed and the upstream coffer is flooded as the diversion is closed and the reservoir begins to fill. Depending on the geography of a dam site, in some applications, a "U"-shaped cofferdam is used in the construction of one half of a dam. When complete, the cofferdam is removed and a similar one is created on the opposite side of the river for the construction of the dam's other half.

The cofferdam is also used on occasion in the shipbuilding and ship repair industry, when it is not practical to put a ship in drydock for repair work or modernization. An example of such an application is the lengthening of ships. In some cases a ship is actually cut in two while still in the water, and a new section of ship is floated in to lengthen the ship. The cutting of the hull is done inside a cofferdam attached directly to the hull of the ship; the cofferdam is then detached before the hull sections are floated apart. The cofferdam is later replaced while the hull sections are welded together again. As expensive as this may be to accomplish, the use of a drydock might be even more expensive. See also caisson.

A 100-ton open caisson that was lowered more than a mile to the sea floor in attempts to stop the flow of oil in the Deepwater Horizon oil spill has been called a cofferdam.

A cofferdam over 1 mile long was built to permit the construction of the Livingstone Channel in the Detroit River. See main article at Stony Island.

Naval architecture

A cofferdam may also refer to an insulating space between two watertight bulkheads or decks within a ship. A cofferdam can be a void (empty) space or a ballast space. Cofferdams are usually employed to ensure that oil or other chemicals do not leak into fresh water tanks which would result in contamination of the drinking water supply on the ship. The cofferdam would be empty at all times and the ship may have sensors within the cofferdam to warn if the cofferdam has begun to fill with liquid. If two different cargoes that react dangerously with each other are carried on the same vessel, one or more cofferdams are usually required between the cargo spaces.

Portable cofferdams
Portable cofferdams can be inflatable or frame and fabric cofferdams that can be reused. Inflatable cofferdams are stretched across the site, then inflated with water from the prospected dry area. Frame and fabric cofferdams are erected in the water and covered with watertight fabric. Once the area is dry, water still remaining from the dry area can be siphoned over to the wet area.

See also
Caisson, a similar watertight structure
Dental dam

References

External links 

 

Dams by type
Naval architecture